Tunisia competed at the 1959 Mediterranean Games in Beirut, Lebanon, with 28 athletes, and the nation finished the competition in the 9th rank and  won 6 medals; 3 gold, 2 silver and a bronze medal.

Medals
Tunisia finished the competition in the second rank in boxing where she won 4 medals; 3 golds and a silver. The second silver medal was won by Mongi Soussi Zarrouki in 400 Metres Hurdles event in a timing of 54.1. Norbert Brami was the winner of the bronze medal in Fencing after 4 victories.

Medals by sport

Medalists

Medal table

See also
 Tunisia at the Mediterranean Games

References

Nations at the 1959 Mediterranean Games
1959
Mediterranean Games